New Bern, formerly called Newbern, is a city in Craven County, North Carolina, United States. As of the 2010 census it had a population of 29,524, which had risen to an estimated 29,994 as of 2019.  It is the county seat of Craven County and the principal city of the New Bern Metropolitan Statistical Area.

It is located at the confluence of the Neuse and the Trent rivers, near the North Carolina coast. New Bern is the birthplace of Pepsi.

New Bern was founded in October 1710 by the Palatines and Swiss under the leadership of Christoph von Graffenried. The new colonists named their settlement after Bern, the Swiss region from which many of the colonists and their patron had emigrated. The flag and arms of the American city are virtually identical to those of the Swiss canton. The English connection with Switzerland had been established by some Marian exiles who sought refuge in Protestant parts of Switzerland. There were also marriages between the House of Stuart and notable people in the history of Calvinism. The colonists later discovered they had started their settlement on the site of a former Tuscarora village named Chattoka. This caused conflicts with the Tuscaroras who were in the area.

New Bern is the second-oldest European settled colonial town in North Carolina, after Bath. It served as the capital of North Carolina from 1770 to 1792. After the American Revolution (1775–1783), New Bern became wealthy and quickly developed a rich cultural life. At one time New Bern was called "the Athens of the South," renowned for its Masonic Temple and Athens Theater. These are both still very active today.

New Bern has four historic districts listed on the National Register of Historic Places; their numerous contributing buildings include residences, stores and churches dating back to the early eighteenth century. Within walking distance of the waterfront are more than 164 homes and buildings listed on the National Register. Also nearby are several bed and breakfasts, hotels, restaurants, banks, antiques stores and specialty shops. The historic districts contain many of the city's 2,000 crape myrtles—its official flower—and developed gardens. New Bern has two "Local Historic Districts", a municipal zoning overlay that affords legal protection to the exteriors of New Bern's historic structures.

History

New Bern was settled in October 1710 by the Palatines and Swiss under the leadership of Christoph von Graffenried. The new colonists named their settlement after the Canton of Bern, home state of their patron. Bernberg had the original plat of the town laid out in the shape of a cross, though later development and additional streets have obscured this pattern within the regular street grid. The British governor’s palace (present-day Tryon Palace) served as the capitol of North Carolina from 1770 until the state government relocated to Raleigh in 1792, after a fire had destroyed much of the capitol. This became the first permanent capital city of North Carolina.

There was no printer in North Carolina until 1749, when the North Carolina Assembly commissioned James Davis from Williamsburg, Virginia to act as their official printer.  Before this time the laws and legal journals of North Carolina were handwritten and were largely kept in a disorganized manner, prompting them to hire Davis. Davis settled in New Bern and was appointed by Benjamin Franklin as North Carolina's first postmaster, who also became active in North Carolina's politics, as a member of the Assembly and later as the Sheriff. Davis also founded and printed the North-Carolina Gazette, North Carolina's first newspaper, printed in his printing house in New Bern.

During the 19th-century Federal period, New Bern became the largest city in North Carolina, developed on the trade of goods and slaves associated with plantation agriculture. After Raleigh was named the state capital, New Bern rebuilt its economy by expanding on trade via shipping routes to the Caribbean and New England. It was part of the Triangle Trade in sugar, slaves, and desired goods. It reached a population of 3,600 in 1815.

In 1862 during the early stages of the American Civil War, the area was the site of the Battle of New Bern. Federal forces captured and occupied the town until the end of the war in 1865. Nearly 10,000 enslaved blacks escaped during this period in the region and went to the United States Army (Union Army)  camps for protection and freedom. The Union Army set up the Trent River contraband camp at New Bern to house the refugees. It organized the adults for work. Missionaries came to teach literacy to both adults and children.

After the January 1863 Emancipation Proclamation of U.S. President Abraham Lincoln, slaves within the Confederate States were declared free, but not those in the United States. His order carefully limited the Proclamation to those areas in insurrection, where civil government was not respected and his military authority, therefore, applied. Because of this proclamation, more freedmen came to the Trent River camp for protection. The Union Army appointed Horace James, a Congregational chaplain from Massachusetts, as the "Superintendent of Negro Affairs for the North Carolina District" on behalf of the Bureau of Refugees, Freedmen and Abandoned Lands. In addition to the Trent River camp, James supervised development of the offshore Roanoke Island Freedmen's Colony, which was intended to be self-supporting. Beginning in 1863, a total of nearly 4,000 freedmen from North Carolina enlisted in the U.S. Colored Troops to fight with the Union Army for their permanent freedom, including 150 men from the colony on Roanoke Island.

Due to the continuous occupation by the Union Army, New Bern avoided some of the destruction of the war years. There was much social disruption because of the occupation and the thousands of freedmen camped near the city. Still, it recovered more quickly than many cities after the war. By the 1870s the lumber industry was developing as the chief part of New Bern's economy. Timber harvested could be sent downriver by the two nearby rivers. The city continued to be a center for freedmen, who created communities independent of white supervision: thriving churches, fraternal associations, and their own businesses. By 1877 the city had a majority-black population.

The state legislature defined the city and county as part of North Carolina's 2nd congressional district which, as former plantation territory, held a concentration of the state's black residents. They elected four blacks to the US Congress in the late 19th century. The state's passage of a constitutional suffrage amendment in 1900 used various devices to disenfranchise black citizens. As a result, they were totally closed out of the political process, including participation on juries and in local offices; white Democrats maintained this suppression mostly, until after passage of federal civil rights legislation, including the Voting Rights Act of 1965, which provided for federal enforcement of constitutional rights.

By 1890 New Bern had become the largest lumber center in North Carolina and one of the largest in all of the South. During this time, as many as 16 lumber mills were running and employing hundreds of men from New Bern and the area. The competitive nature of the lumber barons, the abundance of lumber and craftsmen, led to the construction in New Bern of some of the finest homes in the South, many of which have survived. The lumber boom lasted until the 1920s. One by one the lumber mills went out of business. Today only Weyerhaeuser manufactures lumber in the area.

The city has four National Historic Districts and two local ones, which have helped preserve the character of the architecture. Union Point Park borders the Neuse and Trent rivers.

Hurricanes
New Bern's location near the Atlantic coast renders it subject to the effects of Atlantic hurricane seasons. For example, in the 18th century the town suffered severe damage in the Great Chesapeake Bay Hurricane of 1769.  Other hurricanes such as Hurricane Ione in 1955 and Hurricane Floyd in 1999 (just as examples) have also caused significant flooding and damage.

In September 2018, Hurricane Florence made landfall in the United States just south of Wrightsville Beach, 88.4 miles southwest of New Bern.  A storm surge up to 13.5 feet in addition to days of heavy rains severely flooded various parts of the town. [National Hurricane Center Storm Surge Inundation Map, Sept 13, 2018]

Geography

New Bern is located at the confluence of the Trent and Neuse rivers, two tidal waterways, in North Carolina's Inner Banks region.

U.S. routes 17 and 70 pass through the city, merging briefly as a four-lane expressway passing south of the city center. US 70 leads west  to Kinston and southeast  to Morehead City near the Atlantic Ocean. US 17 leads southwest  to Jacksonville, and crosses the Neuse River on a new bridge to lead north  to Washington.

Climate 
New Bern experiences a humid subtropical climate typical of the Atlantic coastal plain. Summers are hot and humid, with frequent afternoon thunderstorms that account for much of the higher summer precipitation. Spring and fall are generally mild, with fall foliage occurring from late October to early November. Winters are relatively mild and drier than the remainder of the year, with infrequent snowfall.

Demographics

2020 census

As of the 2020 United States census, there were 31,291 people, 13,757 households, and 8,070 families residing in the city.

2012
The population of the area was 30,291 (95% urban, 5% rural) people in 2014, a 31% increase in growth since 2000.  Gender distribution is 47.5% male and 52.5% female with a median resident age of 38.8. The percentage of residents under the age of 18 was 24.2%. The 2012 racial breakdown includes White alone – 16,304 (54%), Black alone – 9,634 (31.9%), Asian alone – 1,844 (6.1%), Hispanic – 1,626 (5.4%),  Two or more races – 747 (2.5%), American Indian alone – 50 (0.2%)  and Other race alone – 13 (0.04%). The median income for a household in the city in 2015 was $41,285.

The City of New Bern 2010 Census information shows the population of the area was approximately 29,524 people. From 2000 to 2010, the New Bern city population growth percentage was 27.7% (or from 23,128 people to 29,524 people). 22.8% of the New Bern city residents were under 18 years of age. Census 2010 race data for New Bern city include the racial breakdown percentages of 57.0 white, 32.8% black, 3.6% Asian, 5.8% Hispanic and less than 1% Native American, Also, there were 14,471 housing units in the City of New Bern, 88.2% of which were occupied housing units.

Arts and culture

New Bern has several sites listed on the National Register of Historic Places.

Education

Colleges 
 Craven Community College
 University of Mount Olive at New Bern

High schools 
 New Bern High School
 Craven Early College High School

Middle schools 
 Grover C. Fields Middle School
 H.J. McDonald Middle School
 West Craven Middle School

Elementary schools 
 Trent Park Elementary School
 Oaks Road Elementary School
 J.T. Barber Elementary School
 Brinson Memorial Elementary School
 Ben D. Quinn Elementary School
 Albert H. Bangert Elementary School
 Creekside Elementary School
 Bridgeton Elementary School

Private schools 
 Calvary Baptist Christian School
 St. Paul Catholic School (St. Paul Education Center)
 The Epiphany School of Global Studies
 New Bern Christian Academy

Media

Radio stations 
 1450 AM / 104.3 FM WNOS – News/Talk/Sports
 1490 AM / 103.9 FM WWNB - ESPN Radio – sports talk
 88.5 FM WZNB - Public Radio East – Classical Music
 89.3 FM WTEB - Public Radio East – NPR/News/Talk
 89.9 FM W210BS - Classical WCPE
 92.7 FM WBNK - K-Love - Christian Contemporary
 91.9 FM WAAE - American Family Radio – Religious
 93.3 FM WERO - Bob 93.3 - Top 40
 94.1 FM WNBU - Talk
 95.1 FM WRNS - Country
 95.7 FM W239BC - R&B Oldies
 97.5 FM WLGT - The Bridge – Contemporary Christian
 97.9 FM WNBB – Classic Country
 99.5 FM WMJV – 99.5/97.5 The Wave – Hot Adult Contemporary
 99.9 FM WTTY-LP - Oldies
 101.9 FM WIKS - Kiss FM – Hip Hop & R&B
 103.3 FM WMGV - V103.3 - Soft AC
 104.5 FM WSTK - Variety
 105.1 FM WHAR - Air 1 - Christian Contemporary
 105.5 FM WXQR – Pure Rock
 107.9 FM WNCT – Classic Hits
 106.5 FM WSFL – Classic Rock
 107.1 FM WTKF-FM – The Talk Station

Infrastructure

Transportation
The airport offers connecting flights to the Atlanta and Charlotte airports daily.

The New Bern Transport Corporation, a business entity owned by PepsiCo to manage its fleet of delivery trucks and other motor vehicles, is located in White Plains, New York, but was named after the town where Pepsi-Cola was first developed.

The north-south U.S. Route 17 and the east-west U.S. Route 70 pass through New Bern.

As late as 1950, the Atlantic and East Carolina Railway offered passenger train service through New Bern to Morehead City to the east, by the Atlantic coast and to Goldsboro Union Station, where timed connections could be made with the Southern Railway's trains to central and western North Carolina. Service was terminated by the end of 1951.

Notable people
 Charles Laban Abernethy (1872–1955), US Congressman from North Carolina between 1922 and 1935
 Lewis Addison Armistead (1817–1863), Confederate States Army general 
 Shawn Armstrong (born 1990), MLB pitcher
 George Edmund Badger (1795–1866), US Senator from 1846 to 1855
 Bessie Banks (born 1938) Singer, Original singer of the song "Go Now"
 Graham Arthur Barden (1896–1967), 13-term US congressman from 1935 to 1961
 Cullen A. Battle (1829–1905), postbellum mayor of New Bern
 Samuel J. Battle (1883–1966), first African-American policeman in New York City
 Walt Bellamy (1939–2013), NBA Hall of Fame basketball player
 Sarah Boone  (1832-1904), Inventor
  Bill Bunting (1947-  ), NBA Basketball player
 Baron of Bernberg (1661–1743), British peer from the Canton of Bern, who founded New Bern in 1710 
 Caleb Bradham (1867–1934), pharmacist, best known as inventor of Pepsi
 John Heritage Bryan (1798–1870), US congressman from 1825 to 1829
 Chase Crawford (born 1996), actor and producer
 James Davis (1721–1785)  First postmaster and first printer of North Carolina. Founder of the North-Carolina Gazette, North Carolina's first newspaper.
 Gary Downs (born 1972), NFL player for the New York Giants, Atlanta Falcons, Denver Broncos; current college football coach
 Davon Drew (born 1985), NFL tight end
 Elwood Edwards (born 1949), voice of AOL's "You've got mail"
 William Gaston (1778–1834), jurist and US congressman from 1813 to 1817
 Montario Hardesty (born 1987), NFL running back for Cleveland Browns
 Nathan Healy (born 1990), professional basketball player
 William J. Hutchins (1813–1884), mercantilist, railroad owner, and Mayor of Houston from 1861 to 1862
 Donna Hutchinson (born 1949), former member of Arkansas House of Representatives, born in New Bern
 Jumpin Jackie Jackson 1940-2019, Harlem Globetrotter basketball player
 George Koonce (born 1968), NFL player for Green Bay Packers and Seattle Seahawks; Athletic Director of University of Wisconsin–Milwaukee
 Valentina Lisitsa (born 1973), concert pianist
 Peter Loftin (1958–2019), entrepreneur
 Bob Mann (1924–2006), NFL player; first African American to play for Detroit Lions and later Green Bay Packers
 Aaron Martin (born 1941), former NFL player for Los Angeles Rams, Philadelphia Eagles, and Washington Redskins
 Eliza Jane McKissack (1828–1900), director and founding member of Conservatory of Music at University of North Texas
 Linda McMahon (born 1948), 25th administrator of the Small Business Administration and former CEO of World Wrestling Entertainment
 Michael R. Morgan (born 1955), African American justice of the Supreme Court of North Carolina
 Dan Neil (born 1960), Pulitzer Prize-winning automotive journalist
 Bob Perry (1934–2017), MLB outfielder
 James E.C. Perry (born 1944), justice of Supreme Court of Florida
 Teddy Shapou (1919–1985), Flying Tiger during World War II
 Brian Simmons (born 1975), NFL player for Cincinnati Bengals and New Orleans Saints
 William Henry Singleton (1843–1938), former slave who became noted American Civil War soldier
 Furnifold Simmons (1854–1940), former U.S. senator
 Richard Dobbs Spaight (1758–1802), 8th Governor of North Carolina from 1792 to 1795, and Congressman for the 10th District from 1798 to 1801
 Edward Stanly (1810–1872), son of John Stanly, congressman 1837–1843, appointed military governor of North Carolina in 1862
 Fabius Maximus Stanly (1815–1882), rear admiral of U.S. Navy, namesake of WWII destroyer USS Stanly (DD-478)
 John Stanly (1774–1834), father of Edward Stanly, congressman (1801–1803 and 1809–1811)
 Sean Strickland (born 1991), MMA fighter, currently competing in the middleweight division of the UFC as of August 2021
 Adam Warren (born 1987), MLB pitcher
 George Henry White (1852–1918), attorney, banker, last of four African-American congressmen from North Carolina in the 19th century; next was not elected until 1992
 Kevin Meade Williamson (born 1966), screenwriter, involved with Scream, I Know What You Did Last Summer, and television series Dawson's Creek
 Bayard Wootten (1875–1959), photographer and suffragette

In popular culture
 Jules Verne's 1896 novel Face au Drapeau (Facing the Flag) featured New Bern as the place where one of that story's main characters is committed to an asylum by the U.S. government.
 Nicholas Sparks set a few of his novels (The Notebook, A Bend in the Road, The Wedding, and The Return) in the city.

References

Further reading

 Browning, Judkin. Shifting Loyalties: The Union Occupation of Eastern North Carolina (Univ of North Carolina Press, 2011). focus on Craven County
 Farmer, Vina Hutchinson. New Bern (Arcadia Publishing, 2007).
 Kinsey, Marissa N. "Beyond the Vale: Visualizing Slavery in Craven County, North Carolina." (2017). online
 
 Watson, Alan D. A History of New Bern and Craven County (Tryon Palace Commission, 1987).
  (Alternative publication)
  - link to Davis biography

External links

 

 New Bern Convention and Visitors Bureau
 

 
Capitals of North Carolina
Cities in Craven County, North Carolina
Cities in North Carolina
County seats in North Carolina
Former colonial capitals in North Carolina
Former state capitals in the United States
German Palatine settlement in the United States
New Bern micropolitan area
Planned cities in the United States
Populated places established in 1710
Populated places in colonial North Carolina
Populated places on the Neuse River
Populated places on the Trent River (North Carolina)
Swiss-American history